The 1956 National Invitation Tournament was the 1956 edition of the annual NCAA college basketball competition.

Selected teams
Below is a list of the 12 teams selected for the tournament. The top four teams are seeded and receive a bye for the first round.

Bracket
Below is the tournament bracket.

See also
 1956 NCAA basketball tournament
 1956 NAIA Basketball Tournament

References

National Invitation
National Invitation Tournament
1950s in Manhattan
Basketball in New York City
College sports in New York City
Madison Square Garden
National Invitation Tournament
National Invitation Tournament
Sports competitions in New York City
Sports in Manhattan